El Planeta Imaginario (The Imaginary Planet), is the seventh studio album by La Oreja de Van Gogh which was released on 4 November 2016 under Sony Music. The album was released five years after the previous one, after the band toured across Latin America and released two live albums. It was produced by Áureo Baqueiro, who produced Primera Fila, one of the live albums released by the band in 2013. Verano (Summer) was chosen as the lead single.

For the first time, keyboardist Xabi San Martín sings one of the songs, the bonus track "Tan guapa", instead of lead vocalist Leire Martínez.

Track listing

Charts

Weekly charts

Monthly charts

Year-end charts

Certifications

References

2016 albums
La Oreja de Van Gogh albums
Spanish-language albums